"I Luv U" is the debut single by British rapper Dizzee Rascal and the lead single from his debut album Boy in da Corner. It was released in May 2003 after a test pressing had leaked to the Internet in 2002. The single became Dizzee Rascal's first top forty hit, peaking at number twenty-nine and spending three weeks inside the top seventy-five. It was followed by the Dizzee Rascal's second single, "Fix Up, Look Sharp".

The song was produced by Dizzee Rascal with vocalist and London rapper Jeanine Jacques featuring on vocals. The song opens with a stuttering voice repeating the song's title, leading into a bass-heavy rhythm.

The Wire described "I Luv U"'s impact on grime as "analogous to "Anarchy in the U.K." for punk rock." The track was named as one of the best songs released between 2000 and 2003 in the 2008 book The Pitchfork 500: Our Guide to the Greatest Songs from Punk to the Present.

Track listing
CD
 "I Luv U" (clean radio edit)
 "I Luv U" (remix) (featuring Wiley and Sharky Major)
 "I Luv U" (bumbaclaat mix)

Charts

References

2002 songs
2003 debut singles
Dizzee Rascal songs
XL Recordings singles
Songs written by Dizzee Rascal